Jocelyn Arthur Kallender (13 February 1870 – 7 October 1953) was a New Zealand cricketer, playing 12 first-class matches for Auckland between 1893 and 1904. He also won the hammer throw at the New Zealand national athletics championships in 1897.

Biography
Kallender was born in Brentford, Middlesex, England, on 13 February 1870, and was baptised in the parish of Heston on 16 April that year. His parents were Katherine Cicelia Kallender and George Kallender, a major in the Madras Staff Corps. As a child, Kallender lived in India with his parents, and he moved to New Zealand in 1892. Kallender worked at the Auckland branch of the Bank of New Zealand for 32 years until his retirement in 1928.

On 14 January 1929, Kallender married Dorothea Mabel Takle (née Gribble) in Auckland.

Kallender died in Auckland on 7 October 1953, and he was buried at Purewa Cemetery. His widow, Dorothea, died in 1957.

Cricket
Kallender stood six feet three and a half inches tall and weighed 18 stone during his cricket career. He played 12 first-class matches for Auckland over as many seasons, from 1893/94 to 1904/05. A fast bowler, he took 16 wickets at an average of 21.12, with best bowling figures of 3 for 7. With the bat, he was reputedly the hardest hitter in New Zealand and a very fast scorer. He scored 389 runs in 22 innings, with a high score of 55 and an average of 18.52.

Other sports
He also played both rugby union and association football, and was active in rowing before moving to New Zealand.

See also
 List of Auckland representative cricketers

References

1870 births
1953 deaths
New Zealand cricketers
Auckland cricketers
People from Brentford
Cricketers from Greater London
Athletes from London
English emigrants to New Zealand
New Zealand male hammer throwers
Burials at Purewa Cemetery